Antti Raanta (born 12 May 1989) is a Finnish professional ice hockey goaltender for the Carolina Hurricanes of the National Hockey League (NHL). Raanta was initially signed by the Chicago Blackhawks as an undrafted player. He has also played for the New York Rangers and the Arizona Coyotes.

Playing career

Lukko (2009–2011)
In March 2008, Raanta signed a three-year-contract with Rauman Lukko of the Finnish Liiga. In 2009, Raanta won bronze in the Lukko U20 team and had the best save percentage in the U20 league. He was called up to the Lukko's men's team but had not yet made a Liiga debut. He played two games in Mestis when the U20 national team played against each Mestis team.

Ässät (2011–2013)
In 2013, Raanta won the Finnish championship with Ässät and was awarded both the Lasse Oksanen Trophy for the SM-liiga's best player of regular season, as well as the Jari Kurri Trophy for the best player of the playoffs, posting a .955 save percentage. In May 2013, HIFK announced that it had signed a two-year-contract with Raanta,  but he didn't play for them, because he had also signed a contract with the Chicago Blackhawks.

Chicago Blackhawks (2013–2015)

On 3 June 2013, Raanta signed a one-year, entry-level contract with the Chicago Blackhawks. He was recalled by the Blackhawks from the American Hockey League (AHL)'s Rockford IceHogs on 17 November 2013, after Chicago's backup goaltender, Nikolai Khabibulin, suffered an injury in a loss against the Nashville Predators the previous night, 16 November. Raanta made his NHL debut against the Colorado Avalanche on 19 November 2013, stopping 14 of 16 shots in relief of starter Corey Crawford. On 30 December 2013, Raanta earned his first career shutout, beating the Los Angeles Kings at home at the United Center. He stopped all 26 shots he faced and improved to 10–1–3 on the season. Raanta was named Rookie of the Month (an honour shared with Los Angeles' goaltender Martin Jones) for December 2013, going 8–1–3 with one shutout. On 12 January 2014, Raanta helped end his team's losing streak; the Blackhawks had previously lost three-straight games, with Crawford in goal for all three losses. Raanta played against the Edmonton Oilers as Chicago prevailed 5–3.

On 27 June 2014, the Blackhawks signed Raanta to a two-year contract extension.

In the 2014–15 season, on 15 November 2014, the Blackhawks announced that Raanta had been assigned to the Rockford IceHogs to make room for rookie goaltender Scott Darling. On 17 December 2014, Raanta was called up from the IceHogs and placed on the Blackhawks' roster, replacing goaltender Darling, who was himself demoted back to Rockford. However, on 22 February 2015, the Blackhawks again reassigned Raanta to the IceHogs after a 6–2 loss against the Boston Bruins, and called up Darling to take his place. Raanta was recalled on 12 April 2015 to join the Blackhawks in the playoffs, but did not dress in any more games. When the Blackhawks went on to win the Stanley Cup, Raanta was given a day with the Cup and a Stanley Cup ring; however, he did not meet the minimum games requirement to include his name on the Stanley Cup, nor had he dressed in the playoffs, as by this time he had been relegated to the Blackhawks' third-string goaltender. Chicago did not request an exemption, because he spent time playing in the minors after the trade deadline and was not dressed during the playoffs.

New York Rangers (2015–2017)
Unable to earn back the backup role on the Blackhawks at season's end, on 27 June 2015, Raanta was traded to the New York Rangers in exchange for Ryan Haggerty.

Raanta would battle Magnus Hellberg for the backup role behind Henrik Lundqvist, Raanta eventually won the battle as Hellberg was sent to the American Hockey League (AHL). Raanta was put in net for the Rangers' 17 December game against the Minnesota Wild (Lundqvist was to start the following day against the Winnipeg Jets). However, near the end of the 1st period, Raanta took a slapshot to the head from Wild defenseman Marco Scandella, and left the game. Lundqvist was put in net the remainder of the game, and the next day Raanta was put on injured reserve. Originally expected to be out 2–3 weeks, Raanta recovered faster than originally expected, returning to the Rangers lineup on 28 December. During Raanta's absence, the Rangers called up Magnus Hellberg to serve as Lundqvist's backup. Raanta made 25 appearances in the 2015–16 season, started 18 games, and finished with an 11–6–2 record. Raanta had a 2.24 GAA and a .919 Save Percentage along with one shutout. At the end of the season, Raanta  agreed to terms on a two-year contract extension with the New York Rangers on 2 May 2016.

Arizona Coyotes (2017–2021)
On 23 June 2017, he was traded by the Rangers along with Derek Stepan to the Arizona Coyotes for Anthony DeAngelo and the 7th overall pick in the 2017 NHL Entry Draft (which became Lias Andersson).

In his first season with the club, Raanta posted a 21–17–6 record in 41 appearances. However, the Coyotes failed to qualify for the 2018 Stanley Cup playoffs. On 6 April 2018, the Coyotes re-signed Raanta to a three-year, $12.75 million contract extension worth $4.25 million annually.

Carolina Hurricanes (2021–present)

After four seasons within the Coyotes organization, largely plagued with injury, Raanta left as a free agent and was signed to a two-year, $4 million contract with the Carolina Hurricanes on 28 July 2021.

On 31 October 2021, Raanta started his first game with the team, winning 2–1 against his former team the Arizona Coyotes. He helped the team go 8–0–0, with Frederik Andersen winning the first seven games of the season. This was the first time in his career that he was playing a team that went undefeated. On 7 April 2022, Raanta won a 5–3 game against the Buffalo Sabres to help the team clinch a playoff spot. On 28 April, after a 6–3 win against the New Jersey Devils, Raanta along with Andersen won the William M. Jennings Trophy]] for allowing the least goals against average. On 2 May, Raanta started the first-round game against the Boston Bruins due to starter goaltender Andersen being injured. He won 5–1 in game one making it his first career playoff win. On 4 May, Raanta exited the game in game two after colliding with the Bruins forward David Pastrňák early in the first period. Backup goaltender Pyotr Kochetkov played the rest of that game and made it a 5–2 win making the Canes 2–0. In game four, Raanta started again losing 5–2. In game seven, Raanta helped the team the win the first round in a 3–2 win.

Career statistics

Regular season and playoffs

International

Awards and honours

References

External links
 

1989 births
Arizona Coyotes players
Ässät players
Carolina Hurricanes players
Chicago Blackhawks players
Finnish ice hockey goaltenders
Living people
Lukko players
New York Rangers players
People from Rauma, Finland
Rockford IceHogs (AHL) players
Stanley Cup champions
Tucson Roadrunners players
Undrafted National Hockey League players
William M. Jennings Trophy winners
Sportspeople from Satakunta